Dilivio Ridgaard (born 16 November 1997) is a South African cricketer. He made his List A debut for Free State in the 2017–18 CSA Provincial One-Day Challenge on 25 February 2018. In September 2018, he was named in Free State's squad for the 2018 Africa T20 Cup. He made his Twenty20 debut for Free State in the 2018 Africa T20 Cup on 14 September 2018. He made his first-class debut for Free State in the 2018–19 CSA 3-Day Provincial Cup on 11 October 2018. In April 2021, he was named in Free State's squad, ahead of the 2021–22 cricket season in South Africa.

References

External links
 

1997 births
Living people
South African cricketers
Free State cricketers
Place of birth missing (living people)